Bijdragen tot de Geschiedenis was a Belgian history journal, published from 1902 to 2005. The journal was initially published in Hoogstraten from 1902 to 1914 under the title Bijdragen tot de Geschiedenis, bijzonderlijk van het aloude Hertogdom Brabant ("Contributions to history, particularly of the former duchy of Brabant"). Publication was disrupted by the First World War. It was continued from 1924 as Bijdragen tot de Geschiedenis. The continuation was published first by the Zuid-Nederlandsche Maatschappij voor Taalkunde en Geschiedenis, and later by the History Department of UFSIA (University Faculties Saint Ignatius Antwerp).

References

External links
 Bijdragen tot de Geschiedenis, vol. 6 (1907), available on Internet Archive. Accessed 8 November 2015.

Quarterly journals
Publications established in 1902
History journals
Academic journals published by learned and professional societies
Publications disestablished in 2005